Harry & Meghan: A Royal Romance is a 2018 historical fiction television film about the meeting and courtship of Harry and Meghan Markle. The movie originally aired on the Lifetime Network on May 13, 2018, as a lead up to the royal wedding. The movie stars Murray Fraser and Parisa Fitz-Henley as the titular Prince Harry and Meghan Markle with Burgess Abernethy and Laura Mitchell co-starring as Prince William, Duke of Cambridge and Catherine, Duchess of Cambridge.

Plot

The film opens with Harry as a young boy on an excursion in Africa with his family after his mother's funeral, where he has a dramatic encounter with a lion. The movie then cuts to Meghan as a young girl, grappling with issues of her biracial heritage and the media's depiction of gender roles. The movie jumps to the present where the couple are set up on a blind date and quickly fall in love. The movie follows their courtship and the intense global media attention surrounding them, as well as the reactions of family and friends to their romancing.

Cast
Murray Fraser as Prince Harry
Parisa Fitz-Henley as Meghan Markle
Burgess Abernethy as Prince William, Duke of Cambridge
Laura Mitchell as Catherine, Duchess of Cambridge
Bonnie Soper as Diana, Princess of Wales 
Steve Coulter as Charles, Prince of Wales
Deborah Ramsay as Camilla, Duchess of Cornwall
Clare Filipow as Stella
Marlie Collins as Annabella
Barbara Wallace as Lady Victoria
Trevor Lerner as Thomas Markle
Melanie Nicholls-King as Doria Ragland

Sequels
The sequel, Harry & Meghan: Becoming Royal was broadcast by Lifetime on May 27, 2019, starring Charles Shaughnessy as Prince Charles; Charlie Field and Tiffany Smith in the title roles and covering their wedding and first year of marriage.

A second Lifetime sequel, title Harry & Meghan: Escaping the Palace starring Sydney Morton and covering their withdrawal from the royal family and the birth of their son Archie, premiered on September 6, 2021.

References

External links

About Harry & Meghan: A Royal Romance

2018 drama films
2018 films
2018 television films
Drama films based on actual events
Lifetime (TV network) films
Cultural depictions of Prince Harry, Duke of Sussex
Cultural depictions of Meghan, Duchess of Sussex
Films scored by Mario Grigorov
Films directed by Menhaj Huda
American drama television films
2010s English-language films
2010s American films